Adriana Beatriz Aguirre (born 16 December 1951) is an Argentine actress and vedette. She performed in several Argentine films and in more than 80 plays.

Biography
Adriana Beatriz Aguirre was born in Santo Tomé, Santa Fe, on 16 December 1951. She studied theatre in the late 1960s.

Aguirre began working as a theatre actress in the early 1970s. In 1972, she made her cinema debut at the age of 21, in the film La sonrisa de mamá, where she had a supporting role. It was not until the 1976 film, Don Carmelo Il Capo, that she played a leading role, Lulu. During that decade, she made most of her films, which were generally in the comic genre. She had great success in El picnic de los Campanelli (1972), Siempre fuimos compañeros (1973), Rolando Rivas, taxista (1974), and Encuentros cercanos con señoras de cualquier tipo (1978). The last film she performed in was Gran Valor en la Facultad de Medicina (1981), with Juan Carlos Calabró. In the following years, she returned to the theatre and it was then that she became a star, along with Graciela Alfano and Alejandra Pradón, among others. In 1995, she appeared on the television series, Como pan caliente. Between 2001 and 2003, there was a resurgence of her fame, when Aguirre was a recurring guest on television programs such as Rumores, Intrusos en el espectáculo, and ZapTV, where she starred in fights with other media personalities such as Guido Süller, Silvia Süller, and her own husband, Ricardo García. In 2007, Aguirre reappeared on television, being a guest on several programs such as Los Profesionales de Siempre and that of Susana Giménez. Aguirre also participated in the second edition of Cantando por un Sueño, starting in October of that year. On 15 April 2008, she was cast in Showmatch, a program hosted by Marcelo Tinelli, for part of the segment Bailando por un Sueño 2008; in the third week, she was eliminated by public vote. In June 2010, she guest starred in a skit in Susana Giménez's show, La empleada pública.

In 1998, Aguirre married Héctor Ricardo García, in a Greek-style ceremony, after three years of dating. In May 2005, Aguirre was assaulted and beaten in her apartment in the Buenos Aires neighborhood of Palermo.

Filmography

 1972: La sonrisa de mamá
 1972: El Picnic de los Campanelli
 1973: The Desire to Live
 1973: Siempre fuimos compañeros
 1974: Clínica con música
 1974: Rolando Rivas, taxista
 1975: Los Chiflados del batallón
 1975: La super, super aventura
 1975: Las procesadas
 1976: The Kids Grow Up
 1976: Don Carmelo il capo
 1976: La Guerra de los sostenes
 1978: Encuentros muy cercanos con señoras de cualquier tipo
 1981: Gran Valor en la Facultad de Medicina
 2017: La vida sin brillos

Television

 1972: Los Campaneli
 1973–1975: Porcelandia
 1973: Pobre Diabla
 1974: Rolando Rivas, taxista
 1975: Piel Naranja
 1977: Porcelandia Show
 1982: Sexcitante
 1980–1983: Polémica en el bar
 1979–1983: La peluquería de Don Mateo
 1982–1983: Operación ja-já
 1984: Porcelandia
 1995: Como pan caliente
 1997: Mediodías con Mauro
 2002: Zap TV
 2002: La tarde de Adriana
 2007: Cantando por un sueño
 2008: Bailando por un sueño 2008
 2008: La noche del domingo
 2010: Susana Giménez: La Empleada Pública
 2010: Aguirre Show – Televisión de San Luis
 2012: Fort Night Show
 2014: Bailando por un sueño 2014 – Pareja invitada en ritmo Merengue junto a Ricardo García

Theatre

 1976: El Gran Cambio – Teatro Cómico.
 1977: ¡Que piernas para el mundial!.
 1978: Los reyes en Tabarís – Teatro Tabarís.
 ????: Atrapadas sin bikinis – Teatro Olimpo.
 1979: ¡Que Revista... en Tabarís – Teatro Tabaris.
 1980: La Revista – Teatro Astros.
 1981: ¿Vio...La Revista? – Teatro Astros.
 1981: ¡¡Revistísima!!.
 1982: El Revistón – Teatro Astros.
 1982: ¡Si... Fantástica! – Teatro Bar de Villa Carlos Paz.
 1983: La revista multitudinaria – Teatro Astros.
 1985: Revista de Carlos Paz.
 1986: Adriana 11.
 1987: Teatro El Nacional – Rosario.
 1988: La revista del Escolazo.
 1989: Una revista de cinco estrellas.
 1990: Comedia en el Teatro Astral.
 1995: Aquí está La Revista – Teatro Metropolitan.
 1997: Locas por dolores.
 1999: La doctora está que arde- Teatro Provincial in Mar del Plata.
 2002: El precio del pudor.
 2003: La noche está que arde – Villa Carlos Paz.
 2008: Doña Flor y sus dos maridos – Mar del Plata.
 2012: Totalmente locos – Teatro La Campana in Mar del Planta.
 2013: Solamente amantes por un verano – Mar del Plata. Multiespacio 5 Sentidos.
 2014: Son furor – Teatro Arenales in Mar del Plata.
 2015: Solo amantes por un verano – Teatro Arenales in Mar del Plata.
 2015/2017: Extinguidas – Teatro Regina.
 2019: La Super Revista de Magia y Humor – Teatro La Campana in Mar del Plata.
 2019: La gran revista de Termas.
 2020: Súper Revista 2020 in Mar del Plata.

Discography
 1977: No puedo mirarte a los ojos ésta noche – (Simple) – POLYDOR
 1984: Pena por una pena – SKY

Music videos

 2013: «Qué tonto fui» - with Ricardo García.
 2013: «Si yo fuera tu amante» - with Ricardo García.
 2013: «Más que un loco» - with Ricardo García.
 2013: «No vale la pena» - with Ricardo García.
 2013: «Amar o morir» - with Ricardo García.
 2013: «Qué queda de éste amor» - with Ricardo García.
 2014: «La reina de la bailanta» - with Ricardo García.

References

External links
 
 Adriana Aguirre at Cinenacional.com

1951 births
Living people
People from Santa Fe, Argentina
Argentine film actresses
Argentine stage actresses
Argentine vedettes
Argentine television actresses
Argentine television personalities
Actresses from Rosario, Santa Fe